Allen Leffingwell Vincent (August 28, 1903 – November 30, 1979) was an American actor and Academy Award-nominated screenwriter. He started as a stage actor in New York City before moving to acting in motion pictures in the late 1920s, then transitioning to screenwriting in the early 1940s. His last credit is as a co-screenwriter for the 1952 film The Girl in White, which starred June Allyson and Arthur Kennedy.

Early years
Vincent was born in Spokane, Washington, the youngest of the two children of William David (1866-1935) and Mary Eva (née Allen) Vincent (1867-1907). Additionally, he had an older half-brother, Harold Allen Speidel (1892-1971), by his mother. His father served as the president and vice chair of Spokane's Old National Bank and Union Trust Company  and following the death of his first wife married Neen Hawley McVey (1872-1959) in 1910. Vincent was raised in the Episcopal church, being baptized on November 1, 1903, and confirmed on March 17, 1918, in Spokane's former All Saints Episcopal Cathedral. From 1920 to 1923 Vincent was a student at Dartmouth College in Hanover, New Hampshire.

Career 
After leaving Dartmouth, Vincent started his career as a stage actor, with his first role in Vanity Fair with Doris Keane in New York City in 1921, followed by serving as an understudy to Noël Coward in The Vortex.  His first credited film role came in 1929's Mother's Boy starring Morton Downey. He would appear in more than 25 films in the next decade, with his most notable role in 1933's Mystery of the Wax Museum, where he played lead actress Fay Wray's love interest. His last known acting appearance happened in 1939 in the noir film Missing Daughters.

Due to the development of a hearing impairment, starting in 1941, he transitioned to screenwriting and editing, his first credit being for The Face Behind the Mask, a noir crime film starring Peter Lorre about a fire-scarred watchmaker who turns to a life of crime to survive. The film initially had poor reviews, but since that time has received increasing praise from more contemporary critics like Leonard Maltin and Dennis Schwartz. His greatest success as screenwriter came with Johnny Belinda, the 1948 film starring Jane Wyman. The screenplay he wrote with Irma von Cube was nominated for a 1949 Academy Award, but lost to John Huston for The Treasure of the Sierra Madre.

Death 
Vincent died on November 30, 1979 at Canoga Terrace Convalescent Hospital in Canoga Park, California. He is not known to have married or had any children, with his sister Josephine Vincent Cowin Gilbert (1901-1987) surviving him.

Filmography

Acting

Screenwriting
 The Face Behind the Mask (1941)
 Song of Love (1947)
 Johnny Belinda (1948)
 The Schumann Story (1950)
 The Girl in White (1952)

References

External links

1903 births
1979 deaths
Writers from Spokane, Washington
American male screenwriters
Dartmouth College
Screenwriters from Washington (state)
Male actors from Washington (state)
20th-century American male writers
20th-century American screenwriters